Malone is an Irish surname. From the Irish "Mael Eóin", the name means a servant or a disciple of Saint John.

People 
 Gilla Críst Ua Máel Eóin (died 1127), historian and Abbot of Clonmacnoise, Ó Maoil Eoin
 Adrian Malone (1937–2015), British documentary filmmaker
 Alfred Malone (born 1982), American football defensive tackle
 Ambrosia Malone (born 1998), Australian field hockey player
 Angela Malone (born 1971), author
 Angie Malone (born 1965), British Paralympian and World Champion Wheelchair curler
 Anna Marie Malone (born 1960), Canadian long-distance runner
 Annie Malone (1877–1957), American businesswoman, inventor, and philanthropist
 Anthony Malone (1700–1776), Irish lawyer and politician
 Arnold Malone (born 1937), Canadian public servant
 Art Malone (1936–2013), American race car driver
 Bennett Malone (1944–2017), American politician
 Benny Malone (born 1952), American football running back
 Bernie Malone (born 1948), Irish Labour Party politician
 Beth Malone (born 1969), American actress and singer
 Beverly Malone (born 1948), nursing executive
 Bill C. Malone (born 1934), American musician, author, and historian
 Blake Malone (born 2001), American soccer player
 Bob Malone (born 1965), American keyboardist, singer, and songwriter
 Bönz Malone, American writer and actor
 Brad Malone (born 1989), Canadian ice hockey forward
 Brendan Malone (born 1942), American basketball coach
 Brent Malone (1941–2004), photorealist painter and gallery owner
 Brian Malone (born 1985), footballer
 Bugzy Malone (born 1990), English grime rapper
 Carole Malone (born 1954), British journalist
 Caroline Malone (born 1957)
 Casey Malone (born 1977), American discus thrower
 Catherine L. Malone, American biologist and an author
 Cecil L'Estrange Malone (1890–1965), British MP and journalist
 Cha Cha Malone (born 1987), singer, music producer, songwriter, composer, and member of b-boy crew Art of Movement
 Chantel Malone (born 1991), athlete in long jump and sprinting
 Charles R. Malone (born 1950s), Chief Justice of the Supreme Court of Alabama
 Charley Malone (1910–1992), American football end
 Chelsea Malone (born 1992), American beauty pageant titleholder
 Chris Malone (born 1978), Australian rugby union coach and player
 Christopher Malone (born 1990), Scottish footballer
 Chuck Malone (born 1965), baseball relief pitcher
 Cliff Malone (1925–2008), Canadian ice hockey forward
 Colleen Malone, New Zealand sprinter
 Dan Malone (born 1955), American journalist
 Dana Malone (1857–1917), American politician
 Darrell Malone (born 1967), American football cornerback
 David Malone (disambiguation), several people
 David M. Malone (born 1954), Canadian author
 DeAngelo Malone (born 1999), American football player
 Denis Malone, Caribbean jurist
 Derek Malone, paralympic athlete
 Dermot Malone ( 2010s), Irish Gaelic footballer
 Dick Malone (born 1947), Scottish former footballer
 Dion Malone (born 1989), Suriname-born Dutch footballer
 Don Malone, Australian rugby league footballer
 Donald Malone (born 1985)
 Dorothy Malone (1924–2018), American actress
 Doug Malone (disambiguation), several people
 Dudley Field Malone (1882–1950), lawyer and activist
 Dumas Malone (1892–1986), American historian, biographer, and editor
 Ed Malone (disambiguation), several people
 Eddie Malone (born 1985), Scottish association football player
 Edmond Malone (1741–1812), Irish Shakespearean scholar and editor
 Edna Malone (1899–?), Canadian dancer
 Edward Cyril Malone (born 1937), Saskatchewan lawyer, politician, and judge
 Edward Malone (disambiguation), several people
 Eileen Malone (1906–1999), American harpist and music educator
 Emmet Malone, Football correspondent
 Fergy Malone (1844–1905), Irish baseball player & manager
 Foster Malone (1887–1926), Canadian ice hockeyer
 Frank Malone (disambiguation), several people
 Gareth Malone (born 1975), English musician, choirmaster, and documentary maker
 George W. Malone (1890–1961), Nevada Senator
 Gerry Malone (born 1950), politician
 Glasses Malone (born 1979), American rapper
 Gordon Malone (born 1974), basketball player
 Greg Malone (disambiguation), several people
 Grover Malone (1895–1950), footballer
 Gus Malone (born 1960), Scottish footballer
 Hugh Malone (1938–2001), American surveyor and politician
 Ian Malone (1974–2003), member of the British Army's Irish Guards
 J. B. Malone (1914–1989), Irish writer and broadcaster
 J.D. Malone (born 1965), singer and songwriter
 J.J. Malone (1935–2004), guitarist, singer, and keyboardist
 J. R. Malone (1858–1935), American baseball umpire
 Jack J. Malone (1919–2001), Australian rules footballer
 James E. Malone Jr. (born 1957), Maryland state legislator
 James F. Malone (1904–1976), district attorney for Allegheny County, Pennsylvania
 James W. Malone (1920–2000), American Roman Catholic bishop
 Jeff Malone (born 1961), American basketball player
 Jena Malone (born 1984), American actress
 Jo Malone (born 1963), British perfumer
 Joe Malone ("Phantom Joe", 1890–1969), Canadian ice hockey player
 John C. Malone (born 1941), chairman of the Liberty Media Corporation
 Joseph Malone (VC) (1833–1883), British soldier
 Joseph R. Malone (born 1949), New Jersey state legislator
 Josh Malone (born 1996), American football player
 Karl Malone (born 1963), American basketball player
 Kelvin Malone (1961–1999), American spree killer
 Kyp Malone (born 1973), American rock musician
 Lew Malone (1897–1972), American baseball player
 Manie Malone (born 1981), Ivorian actress
 Mark Malone (born 1958), American former football player and television commentator
 Martin M. Malone (1888-1962), American businessman and politician
 Maud Malone (1873–1951), American librarian and suffragette
 Maurice Malone (born 2000), German footballer
 Michael Malone (disambiguation), several people
 Michelle Malone, American guitarist and singer-songwriter
 Molly Malone (actress) (1888–1952), American silent-film actress
 Moses Malone (1955–2015), American basketball player
 Percy Malone (born 1942), Arkansas state legislator
 Peter Malone (mayor) (1928–2006), former Mayor of Nelson, New York
 Post Malone (born 1995), American rapper, singer, songwriter, and record producer
 Richard J. Malone (born 1946), American Roman Catholic bishop
 Robert Malone (American football) (born 1988), American football punter
 Robert W. Malone (born 1959 or 1960), American virologist, immunologist and molecular biologist
 Roberto Malone (born 1956), Italian porn actor
 Ryan Malone (born 1979), American ice hockey player on the Tampa Bay Lightning
 Ryan Malone (soccer) (born 1992), American soccer player
 Sam Malone (politician), (born 1970), Cincinnati city council member tried for domestic violence
 Scott Malone (born 1991), English footballer
 Sean Malone (1970–2020), American musician and professor
 Slauson Malone (born 1995), American musician
 Terry Malone, American football coach 
 Thomas H. Malone (1834–1906), Confederate veteran, judge and Dean of the Vanderbilt University Law School
 Tina Malone (born 1963), English actress from Shameless
 William Malone (director) (born 1953), American filmmaker
 Lieutenant Colonel William George Malone (1859–1915), World War I New Zealand soldier
 William M. Malone (1900–1981), Californian politician

Characters 
 Ed Malone, narrator of the book The Lost World
 Bugsy Malone, a 1976 character in a popular film of the same name
 Cotton Malone, a character of Steve Berry's books
 Maggie Malone Seaver, a working (news reporter) mom in the television series Growing Pains (1985–1992), played by Joanna Kerns
 Detective Malone, alias of Martin Lawrence's character in the film Blue Streak (1999)
 Harry Malone (disambiguation), several characters
 Special Agent Jack Malone (Without a Trace), portrayed by Anthony LaPaglia in the television program Without a Trace
Jasmine Malone, a character in The Bold and the Beautiful, portrayed by Lark Voorhies (1995-1996)
 Jim Malone, Sean Connery's character in the film The Untouchables (1987)
 Kevin Malone, accountant at Dunder Mifflin on the TV Show The Office
 Nomi Malone, lead character in the film Showgirls (1995) portrayed by Elizabeth Berkley 
 Matches Malone, criminal alias of the Batman
 Richard Malone, former CIA agent, and the main character in the 1987 film Malone, played by Burt Reynolds
 Rita Malone, a character in Flushed Away, voiced by Kate Winslet
 Rubi Malone, heroine of the video game WET
 Scobie Malone, character in 20 novels by Jon Cleary, and the film based on one, Scobie Malone (1975)
 Sam Malone, a character on the sitcom Cheers
 Stella Malone, a character in Jonas, played by Chelsea Kane
 Dr. Mary Malone, a character in Phillip Pullman's His Dark Materials Trilogy
Valerie Malone, a character in Beverly Hills 90210, portrayed by Tiffany Amber Thiessen (1994–98)

References 

Irish families
Surnames of Irish origin
English-language surnames

de:Malone
es:Malone
fr:Malone
lv:Malons
nl:Malone
ja:マローン
pl:Malone
pt:Malone
ru:Мэлоун
vo:Malone